This is a list of football clubs in Gibraltar.

Gibraltar National League
 F.C. Bruno's Magpies
 College 1975 F.C.
 Europa F.C.
 Europa Point F.C.
 Glacis United F.C.
 Lincoln Red Imps F.C.
 Lions Gibraltar F.C.
 Lynx F.C.
 Manchester 62
 Mons Calpe S.C.
 St Joseph's F.C.

Gibraltar Intermediate League
 F.C. Hound Dogs (participating in Intermediate League due to dispensation)
 11 Intermediate/U-23 teams from the 11 Gibraltar National League teams

Former Men's Participating Clubs
 Angels F.C.
 Boca Gibraltar
 F.C. Britannia XI
 Gibraltar Phoenix F.C.
 Gibraltar United F.C.
 Cannons F.C.
 Gibraltar F.C.
 Gibraltar Pilots F.C.
 Gibraltar Scorpions F.C.
 Laguna F.C.
 F.C. Olympique 13
 Pegasus F.C.
 Prince of Wales F.C.
 Red Imps F.C.
 Shamrock 101 F.C.
 Sporting Club Gibraltar F.C.
 Stan James Athletic F.C.
 Jubilee F.C.
 Albion F.C.
 Exiles F.C.
 Athletic F.C.
 South United
 Royal Sovereign F.C.
 Commander of the Yard F.C.
 Chief Construction F.C.
 Chief Constructor F.C.
 St Theresa's F.C.

Women's League

 Europa Ladies
 Gibraltar Wave F.C.
 Lions Gibraltar Ladies
 Lynx Women F.C.

Former Women's League Participating Clubs
 Gibraltar United F.C.
 Lincoln Ladies
 Manchester 62 Ladies
 St Joseph's

Gibraltar
 

Football clubs